MultiMate was a word processor developed by Multimate International for IBM PC MS-DOS computers in the early 1980s.

History
With 1,000 computers, Connecticut Mutual Life Insurance was one of the first large-volume customers for the IBM PC. It hired W. H. Jones & Associates to write word-processing software for the computer that would not require retraining its employees, already familiar with Wang Laboratories word processing systems. W. H. Jones' head Will Jones and five other developers created the software. W. H. Jones retained the right to sell the program elsewhere, and WordMate appeared in December 1982. The company renamed itself to SoftWord Systems, then Multimate International, while renaming WordMate to MultiMate. Advertisements stated that MultiMate "mimic[ked] the features and functions of a dedicated system", and that it was "modeled after the Wang word processor". Like Connecticut Mutual, many customers purchased it because of the similarity with the Wang.

MultiMate was not marketed heavily to end-users, but was quickly popular with insurance companies, law firms, other business computer users and US government agencies and the military. While the Wang WP keyboard was different from the original PC keyboard, MultiMate compensated by providing a large plastic template that clipped on the PC keyboard, and stick-on labels for the fronts of the PC keys. The template and labels color-coded the combination keystrokes using the SHIFT, ALT and CTRL keys with all 10 of the PC's function keys and many of the character keys. Like Wang systems, MultiMate controlled most editing operations with function keys, assigning four functions to each of the 10 function keys, which IBM initially located at the left side of the keyboard in two vertical rows. It also included a "document summary" screen for each document, another Wang feature, which allowed more sophisticated document-management than the brief file names allowed by MS-DOS and PC DOS. As function selection through key-controlled screen-top drop-down menus was popularized by other programs, MultiMate added menus.

MultiMate's popularity rapidly grew. In January 1983 some employees were paid late because of slow sales, but two months later revenue grew 25-fold after good reviews appeared in magazines. The company's fiscal 1984 sales were $15 million or more, and by early 1985 MultiMate's installed base in companies was as large as former market leader WordStar's. Jones sold the company to Ashton-Tate in December 1985 for about $20 million. An Ashton-Tate press release called the acquisition "the largest ever in the microcomputer software industry".

Other MultiMate products included foreign language versions of the software (i.e., "MultiTexto" in Spanish), a hardware interface card for file-transfer with Wang systems, a keyboard with extra function keys, versions of MultiMate for different PC clone MS-DOS computers, and for use on PC networks from Novell, 3COM and IBM (Token Ring). Early attempts to create a MultiMate Data Manager and List Manager in-house never reached the market.

Multimate International developed the core word processing software and utilities (file conversion, printer drivers), but purchased and adapted sub-programs for spelling and grammar checking, list management, outlining and print-time incorporation of graphics in word processing documents (MultiMate GraphLink). In addition to rebranding such externally developed programs, Multimate rewrote the documentation for each program and adapted the program interfaces to more closely resemble the word processor. The last version of MultiMate was packaged with many of these add-on programs under the product name "MultiMate Advantage" to compete with other word processor software of the day, especially IBM DisplayWrite for DOS, which Multimate International developers saw as their main competition in the business market, and to a lesser extent WordPerfect, the DOS incarnation of Microsoft Word and the Samna word processor, which had its roots in another office word processing computer.

One of the first "clone" versions of MultiMate was bundled with an early portable PC made by Corona. Other versions were written to match PCs by Radio Shack, Texas Instruments, Toshiba, the early Grid laptop and the IBM PC Junior.

(A company legend was that the MultiMate user manual was written first, by an experienced Wang WP manager, then the programmers were told to write software to match it, which is how the Wang WP was created.)

Early versions of the program came with both color-coded key stickers and a plastic full-keyboard template to make Wang operators more comfortable with the smaller IBM PC keyboard. MultiMate eventually sold a hardware keyboard with dedicated function keys and issued versions of its software for networked PCs. It adapted list-management, graphics and outlining software from other vendors to the look-and-feel of MultiMate, shipping the expanded version as MultiMate Advantage, with additional volumes of MultiMate-style documentation for the add-on programs.

Early releases of MultiMate also gave users unlimited access to a toll-free support number and a promise of low-cost upgrades, which contributed to its dedicated user population. Support policies later were brought in line with Ashton-Tate's standard practices.

MultiMate was especially good at supporting a variety of PC clones and hundreds of computer printers, each of which required its own printer driver. The company's printer support was very strong with daisy-wheel and dot-matrix printers, but did not take much advantage of the development of PostScript fonts and laser printers.

Ashton-Tate never released a Windows version. It discontinued MultiMate's development efforts on VMS and Unix platforms and closed a development group in Dublin, Ireland. The product was dropped after the Ashton-Tate itself was purchased by Borland.

Reception
PC Magazine in February 1983 stated that MultiMate "virtually remakes your computer into a Wang-like dedicated word processor", and that it was "very fast, easy to learn, and capable" with many features. The review noted the application's inability to use more than 128K of RAM, but praised the documentation and built-in help, and stated that many commands required half the keystrokes of the WordStar equivalent. The review concluded "MultiMate stands head and shoulders above many if not most [IBM PC word processors] ... an impressive entrant".

BYTE in 1984 was less positive. It described version 3.20 as being "very safe" because of many backups and safeguards and praised the formatting features, customization ability, and quality of the (very busy) toll-free help line. The review, however, called MultiMate "the klunkiest package" of five tested word processors because of the overemphasis on safety, criticized the built-in help and slow performance, and reported being unable to use the spell checker because of its poor quality. However, the reviewer mentioned that MultiMate version 3.30 was already shipping when the article went to press.

References

See also 
 List of word processors

1982 software
DOS software
Word processors